Blake Matthew Trahan (born September 5, 1993) is an American former professional baseball shortstop. He played for the Cincinnati Reds of Major League Baseball (MLB).

Career
Trahan attended Kinder High School in Kinder, Louisiana. He enrolled at the University of Louisiana at Lafayette to play college baseball for the Louisiana-Lafayette Ragin' Cajuns baseball team. In 2015, Trahan was named the Sun Belt Conference Baseball Player of the Year.

Cincinnati Reds
Considered a potential first round draft pick in the 2015 MLB Draft, the Cincinnati Reds selected Trahan in the third round, with the 84th overall selection. Trahan signed with the Reds, receiving a $708,900 signing bonus, and began his professional career with the Billings Mustangs of the Rookie-level Pioneer League. After posting a .312 batting average with an .803 OPS, he was promoted to the Daytona Tortugas of the Class A-Advanced Florida State League to end the season, where he struggled, batting .139 in 11 games. In 2016, he returned to Daytona, where he posted a .263 batting average, along with four home runs, 47 RBIs, and 25 stolen bases. He played for the Pensacola Blue Wahoos of the Class AA Southern League in 2017 where he batted .222 with two home runs and 27 RBIs in 136 games. In 2018, he played for the Louisville Bats of the Class AAA International League. The Reds promoted him to the major leagues on September 1. He played in 11 games for Cincinnati. After the 2018 season, he won the Minor League Baseball Rawlings Gold Glove Award.

Trahan began the 2019 season with Louisville. On August 5, 2019, Trahan was designated for assignment, and outrighted off the roster on August 8. 

Trahan participated in 2020 spring training with the Reds, which was canceled due to the COVID-19 pandemic. Upon the resumption of the MLB season in July, Trahan was invited to return to the team on June 28, but opted to retire from baseball.

References

External links

1993 births
Living people
People from Allen Parish, Louisiana
Baseball players from Louisiana
Major League Baseball shortstops
Cincinnati Reds players
Louisiana Ragin' Cajuns baseball players
Greeneville Reds players
Billings Mustangs players
Daytona Tortugas players
Pensacola Blue Wahoos players
Louisville Bats players
Scottsdale Scorpions players
Tigres del Licey players
American expatriate baseball players in the Dominican Republic